Chocolove from AKB48 was a sub-unit consisting of three members from the idol group AKB48. It is the fourth unit under AKB48, and the first to release more than one single.

The group's debut single "Ashita wa Ashita no Kimi ga Umareru", which served as the ending theme for the anime adaptation of Skull Man, reached number 18 on the Oricon's Weekly Single Charts, and charted for three weeks in 2007. Their second single "Mail no Namida" reached number 29 and charted for two weeks.

Members 
 Rina Nakanishi (Team A) 
 Sayaka Akimoto (Team K)
 Sae Miyazawa (Team K)

Singles

Albums

References

Sources 
About Chocolove from AKB48

External links 
 Chocolove from AKB48 Official Site

AKB48 sub-units
Japanese musical trios
Japanese pop music groups
Japanese girl groups
Japanese idol groups
Universal Music Japan artists
Musical groups established in 2007
2007 establishments in Japan
Defstar Records artists